Miss Bangladesh  is a national beauty pageant in Bangladesh that annually selects representatives to compete in Miss World, one of the Big Four international beauty pageants.  It is owned by Omicon Entertainment.

The reigning Miss Bangladesh titleholder is Rafah Nanjeba Torsa who was crowned by the outgoing titleholder Jannatul Ferdous Oishee.

History
The Miss Bangladesh Contest was first organized in 1994, but the event did not attract national media attention. In 1994, Anika Taher first represented Bangladesh at the beauty pageant Miss World 1994 held in Sun City, South Africa. Shaila Simi was awarded the Miss Ruposhi Dhaka, Bangladesh award in 1998.  Sonia Gazi (who was Miss Bangladesh 2000) received media attention. Tabassum Ferdous Shaon, who participated in the Miss World 2001 in South Africa was the last Bangladeshi contestant. Bangladesh has not sent a representative to Miss World since 2001. The pageant returned briefly for one year in 2007 and was organized by Apurbo.com and sponsored by Motherland Group/Cinevision. However, the winner did not take part in Miss World. After 16 years later Antar Showbiz was created Miss World Bangladesh to give Bangladesh the opportunity to participate in the "Miss World" pageant again. Shirin Akter Shila become the first Miss Universe Bangladesh who represented her country in Miss Universe 2019.

Titleholders
Color key

1994-2001 
Miss Bangladesh Organized winner was sending to Miss World. In 2007, Miss Bangladesh was organized by Apurbo.com and sponsored by Motherland Group/Cinevision. However, the winner did not take part in Miss World.

Miss World Bangladesh

The winner of Miss World Bangladesh represents her country at the Miss World pageant.

Photographs of some notable titleholders

See also
Miss Universe Bangladesh
Miss World Bangladesh
Miss Earth Bangladesh
Bangladesh at major beauty pageants

References

External links

 

Beauty pageants in Bangladesh
Women in Bangladesh
1994 establishments in Bangladesh
Bangladeshi awards
Competitions in Bangladesh